{{Infobox military conflict
|conflict=Battle of Corregidor
| image= corregidor gun.jpg
| image_size = 300
|caption=Victorious Japanese troops atop the Hearn Battery, May 6, 1942.
|partof=the Pacific Theater of World War II
|date=May 5–6, 1942
|place=Corregidor island in Manila Bay, Luzon Island, Philippines
|result=Japanese victory
|combatant1 = 
 
|combatant2=
|commander1= Jonathan M. Wainwright George F. Moore Samuel L. Howard
|commander2= Masaharu Homma Kureo Taniguchi Gempachi Sato Kizon Mikami Haruji Morita Col. Koike Col. Inoue
| units1       = Ground units:
 4th Marine Regiment

 Philippine Department
  59th Coast Artillery Regiment
  60th Coast Artillery Regiment
  91st Coast Artillery Regiment
  92nd Coast Artillery Regiment
  803rd Engineer Aviation Battalion
 Company A
 Philippine Commonwealth Army
  1st Coast Artillery Regiment
  2nd Coast Artillery Regiment
 Battery D
 Battery F
Naval Units: 
 16th Naval District
  U.S. Navy Inshore Patrol

USS Pigeon (ASR-6) 
 (abandoned ship) crew 
| units2       =Ground units:  
 Japanese Fourteenth Army  4th Infantry Division
  7th Tank RegimentAerial units: 
 22nd Air Brigade

|strength1=13,000 U.S. and Filipino troops, 2 gunboats, and 1 minesweeper
|strength2=75,000 Japanese troops
|casualties1=800 killed1,000 wounded11,000 POWs1 gunboat sunk1 gunboat scuttled1 minesweeper scuttled
|casualties2=900 killed1,200 wounded
|}}

The Battle of Corregidor, fought on May 5–6, 1942, was the culmination of the Japanese campaign for the conquest of the Commonwealth of the Philippines during World War II.

The fall of Bataan on April 9, 1942, ended all organized opposition by the U.S. Army Forces Far East to the invading Japanese forces on Luzon, in the northern Philippines. The island bastion of Corregidor, with its network of tunnels and formidable array of defensive armaments, along with the fortifications across the entrance to Manila Bay, was the remaining obstacle to the 14th Japanese Imperial Army of Lieutenant General Masaharu Homma. Homma had to take Corregidor, since as long as the island remained in American hands, the Japanese would be denied the use of Manila Bay, the finest natural harbor in the Far East.

The U.S. Army eventually recaptured the island in 1945.

Background
Gibraltar of the East

Corregidor, officially named Fort Mills, was the largest of four fortified islands protecting the mouth of Manila Bay and had been fortified prior to World War I with powerful coastal artillery. Its widest and elevated area, known as Topside, held most of the fort's 56 coastal artillery pieces and installations.

Middleside was a small plateau containing battery positions as well as barracks. Bottomside was the lower area, where a dock area and the civilian town of San Jose were located. Americans called it "The Rock" or even the "Gibraltar of the East", comparing it to the fortress that guards the entrance to the Mediterranean Sea between Europe and Africa.

The tunnel system under Malinta Hill was the most extensive construction on Corregidor. A separate system of tunnels north of this housed the underground hospital. It had 12 laterals (tunnels) and space for 1,000 beds. The facility could be reached either through the main tunnel or by a separate outside entrance on the north side of Malinta Hill. The Navy tunnel system, which lay opposite the hospital, under the south side of Malinta was connected to the main tunnel by a partially completed low passageway through the quartermaster storage lateral.

East of this was Malinta Tunnel, the location of General Douglas MacArthur's headquarters (Lieutenant General Jonathan M. Wainwright's headquarters during the battle, after MacArthur relocated to Australia on 12 March 1942). Reinforced with concrete walls, floors, and overhead arches, it also had blowers to furnish fresh air, and a double-track electric tramway line along the east–west passage. The Malinta Tunnel furnished bombproof shelters for the hospital, headquarters, and shops, as well as a maze of underground storehouses.

Defenses

The defensive arsenal on Corregidor was formidable with 45 coastal guns and mortars organized into 23 batteries, some seventy-two anti-aircraft weapons assigned to thirteen batteries and a minefield of approximately 35 groups of controlled mines.

Caballo Island, with Fort Hughes—just south of Corregidor—was the next largest in area. Commander Francis J. Bridget was in charge of its beach defenses with a total of 800 men, of whom 93 were Marines and 443 belonged to the Navy, by the end of April 1942. Coastal artillery numbered some 13 assorted pieces, including a single 14-inch M1910 field gun, four 12-inch M1912 mortars, two 6-inch M1908 guns, and 2 3-inch M1903 guns, with its anti-aircraft defenses are tied in with those of Corregidor.

Equipped with four  guns in armored turrets facing seaward, a secondary battery of four casemated  guns, and two anti-aircraft guns, the fort with its 200-man garrison was considered impregnable to attack.

The last—Carabao Island—lay only  from the shores of Cavite Province. The Americans had placed Fort Frank on this island, which late in 1941, had a military garrison of about 400 men, mostly Philippine Scouts. Its armament consisted of two  guns, eight  mortars, four  GPFs, as well as anti-aircraft and beach defense weapons.

All four forts in Manila Bay—as well as Fort Wint in Subic Bay—had been formed before the war into an organization called the Harbor Defenses of Manila and Subic Bays, which by August 1941 became a part of the Philippine Coast Artillery Command. Both were under Major General George F. Moore who also commanded the Corregidor garrison. The 5,700 men of the Harbor Defense Force were assigned to four Coast Artillery Regiments: the 59th, 60th, 91st, and 92nd CA (the 60th CA being an antiaircraft artillery unit and the 91st and 92d CA Philippine Scouts units), plus headquarters and service troops.

About 500 Philippine Army soldiers in training were organized into the 1st and 2nd Coast Artillery Regiments (PA), but operated under the control of the two PS regiments. Gen. Moore organized the force into four commands to exercise tactical control: (1) seaward defense, and (2) North and South Channels defense, under Colonel Paul D. Bunker; (3) anti-aircraft and air warning defenses under Col. Theodore M. Chase, and (4) inshore patrol under Captain Kenneth M. Hoeffel of the US Navy's 16th Naval District.

After their evacuation from Olongapo in Zambales, close to Subic Naval Base on December 26, the 4th Marine Regiment—under the command of Col. Samuel L. Howard—became the primary fighting unit on the island. Corregidor's garrison received the largest group of reinforcements right after the fall of Bataan, with some 72 officers and 1,173 enlisted men from more than fifty different units were integrated and assigned to the 4th Marine Regiment. Few of the reinforcements were trained or equipped for ground combat. By April 30, 1942, the 4th Marines actually numbered 229 officers and 3,770 men, of whom only 1,500 were members of the Corps.

Siege

On December 29, 1941, the defenders got their first taste of aerial bombardment on Corregidor. The attack lasted for two hours as the Japanese destroyed or damaged the hospital, Topside and Bottomside barracks, the Navy fuel depot and the officers club. Three days later, the island garrison was bombed for more than three hours.

Periodic bombing continued over the next four days, but with only two more raids for the rest of January, the defenders had a chance to improve their positions considerably. To the amusement of the beach defenders on Corregidor, the Japanese dropped only propaganda leaflets on January 29.

On 3 February 1942  arrived at Corregidor with 3,500 rounds of 3-inch anti-aircraft ammunition. Along with mail and important documents, Trout was loaded with 20 tons of gold and silver previously removed from banks in the Philippines before departing.

On March 12, under cover of darkness, Gen. MacArthur was evacuated from Corregidor, using four PT boats bound for Mindanao, from where he was eventually flown to Australia. He left Lt. Gen Jonathan M. Wainwright in command in the Philippines.

From December 29 to the end of April 1942, despite incessant Japanese aerial, naval and artillery bombardment, the garrison on Corregidor, which consisted of the 4th Marine Regiment and combined units from the United States Army, the US Navy, and locally recruited Filipino soldiers, resisted valiantly, inflicting heavy enemy losses in men and aircraft.

The defenders were living on about 30 ounces of food per day. Drinking water was distributed only twice a day, but the constant bombing and shelling often interrupted the distribution of rations. When the bombardment killed horses of the Cavalry, the men would drag the carcasses down to the mess hall for consumption. The continued lack of proper diet created problems for the Corregidor garrison, as men weakened and lacked reliable night vision. From Cebu, seven private ships under orders from the army, loaded with a supply of food, sailed towards Corregidor. Only one reached the island, the MV Princessa commanded by 3rd Lieutenant Zosimo Cruz (USAFFE).

Japanese artillery bombardment of Corregidor began immediately after the fall of Bataan on 9 April. It became intense over the next few weeks as more guns were brought up, and one day's shelling was said to equal all the bombing raids combined in damage inflicted. However, after an initial response from a 155 mm GPF battery, Lt. Gen. Wainwright prohibited counterbattery fire for three days, fearing there were wounded POWs on Bataan who might be killed.

Japanese bombing and shelling continued with unrelenting ferocity. Japanese aircraft flew 614 missions, dropping 1,701 bombs totaling some 365 tons of explosive. Joining the aerial bombardment were nine  howitzers, thirty-four  howitzers, and 32 other artillery pieces, which pounded Corregidor day and night. It was estimated that on May 4 alone, more than 16,000 shells hit Corregidor.

As of about April 15, 1942, the combined strength of the four fortified islands—including US Army, Philippine Scouts, Philippine Army, US Marine Corps, US Navy, Philippine Navy, and civilians—totaled about 14,728.

From April 28, a concentrated aerial bombardment by the 22nd Air Brigade of Maj. Gen. Kizon Mikami—supported by ground artillery on Bataan from May 1–5, preceded landing operations.

On the night of 4 May a submarine returning to Australia from patrol evacuated 25 persons. Among the passengers were Colonel Constant Irwin, who carried a complete roster of all Army, Navy, and Marine personnel still alive; Col. Royal G. Jenks, a finance officer, with financial accounts; Col. Milton A. Hill, the inspector general, 3 other Army and 6 Navy officers, and about 13 nurses. Included in the cargo sent from Corregidor were several bags of mail, the last to go out of the Philippines, and "many USAFFE and USFIP records and orders."

Japanese propaganda to its home population repeatedly declared in this period that Corregidor was about to fall, followed by weeks of silence when it did not happen. Imperial General Headquarters finally declared that the resistance was becoming a serious embarrassment.

Fall

On May 5, Japanese forces led by Maj. Gen. Kureo Taniguchi boarded landing craft and barges and headed for the final assault on Corregidor. Shortly before midnight, intense shelling struck the beaches between North Point and Cavalry Point. The initial landing of 790 Japanese soldiers quickly bogged down due to surprisingly fierce resistance from the American and Filipino defenders, whose 37 mm artillery exacted a heavy toll on the invasion fleet. It was a bloodbath. Observers at Cabcaben described the scene as "a spectacle that confounded the imagination, surpassing in grim horror anything we had ever seen before."

The Japanese landing was difficult because of the strong sea currents between Bataan and Corregidor, as well as the layers of oil that covered the beaches from ships sunk earlier in the siege. They had considerable trouble landing personnel and equipment. However, the sheer numbers of the Japanese infantry, equipped with 50 mm grenade launchers ("knee mortars"), eventually forced the defenders to pull back from the beach.

The second battalion of 785 Japanese soldiers was not as successful. They landed east of North Point, where the defensive positions held by the 4th Marines Regiment were stronger. Most of the Japanese officers were quickly killed, and the huddled survivors were hit with hand grenades, machine guns, and rifle fire. Nevertheless, some of the landing managed to unite with the first invasion force, and together they moved inland and had captured the Denver Battery by 01:30 on May 6.

The Americans launched a counterattack to eject the Japanese from the Denver Battery, and this saw the heaviest fighting between the opposing forces, virtually hand to hand. The counterattack went quite well in the beginning, managing to overrun the Japanese position on the western slope of Denver Battery Hill. Lieutenant Otter and 6 other ranks advanced near the gun pit, where a Japanese heavy machine gun was positioned. They all threw grenades into the pit and put the gun out of action. Immediately after that, a group of Japanese occupied the gun pit and wiped out Otter and 4 of his men. Thus, the counterattack stalled and did not make any more progress. 

By 04:30, Colonel Howard had committed his last reserves, consisting of about 500 Marines, a few sailors, and the soldiers of the 4th Battalion. These reinforcement tried to join the battle as quickly as possible, but Japanese snipers had slipped behind the front lines and any movement was very costly. To make matters worse, another 880 Japanese reinforcements arrived at 05:30. The 4th Marines held their positions, but the Americans were losing ground in other areas. The Japanese had a problem of their own: several ammunition crates never made the landing, due to the sailors's fear of getting hit by American artillery. As a result, several Japanese attacks and counterattacks were made using bayonets.

The defenders' final blow came at 09:30, when three Japanese tanks were landed and immediately went into action. The tanks destroyed and routed the counterattack at Denver Battery. The men withdrew to the ruins of a concrete trench a few yards from the entrance to Malinta tunnel. At the same moment, Japanese artillery delivered a heavy barrage. Aware of the consequences if the Japanese captured the tunnel, where about 1,000 helpless wounded men lay, and realizing the Malinta tunnel could not hold out much longer, Wainright knew that more Japanese would be landed at night. He decided to sacrifice one more day of freedom in exchange for several thousand lives.

In a radio message to President Franklin Roosevelt, Wainwright said, "There is a limit of human endurance, and that point has long been passed." Colonel Howard burned the 4th Marine Regiment's flag as well as the national colors to prevent their capture. Wainwright surrendered the Corregidor garrison at about 1:30 p.m. on May 6, 1942, with two officers sent forward with a white flag to carry his surrender message to the Japanese.

Aftermath

The Japanese losses from January 1 – April 30 and from the initial assault landings on May 5/6, were about 900 dead and 1,200 wounded, while the defenders suffered 800 dead and 1,000 wounded.

Corregidor's defeat marked the fall of the Philippines and Asia, but Imperial Japan's timetable for the conquest of Australia and the rest of the Pacific was severely upset. Its advance was ultimately checked at the battle for New Guinea, and at Guadalcanal, the turning point in the Pacific War.

About 4,000 of the 11,000 American and Filipino prisoners of war from Corregidor were marched through the streets of Manila to incarceration at Fort Santiago and Bilibid Prison, criminal detention centers turned POW camps. US Army and Navy nurses (the "Angels of Bataan and Corregidor") continued to work on Corregidor for several weeks, and were then sent to Santo Tomas. The rest were sent off in trains to various Japanese prison camps. General Wainwright was incarcerated in Manchuria. Over the course of the war, thousands were shipped to the Japanese home islands as slave labor. Some were eventually freed at the Raid at Cabanatuan and during the battle for Manila's liberation. While most of the Allied forces on Corregidor surrendered, many individuals continued fighting as guerrillas.

General Masaharu Homma, who conquered the Philippines in five months instead of the projected two, ended up being relieved of his command.

Historical commemoration

An unnamed Marine from the 4th Marine Regiment wrote the following lyrics to the tune of the 'Marines' Hymn,' just before going into battle in Corregidor. The author of "The Corregidor Hymn" was captured by the Japanese in the battle and was never seen again.

"First to jump for holes and tunnels
And to keep our skivvies clean,
We are proud to claim the title
of Corregidor's Marines.

"Our drawers unfurled to every breeze
From dawn to setting sun.
We have jumped into every hole and ditch
And for us the fightin' was fun.

"We have plenty of guns and ammunition
But not cigars and cigarettes,
At the last we may be smoking leaves
Wrapped in Nipponese propaganda leaflets.

"When the Army and the Navy
Looked out Corregidor's Tunnel Queen,
They saw the beaches guarded
by more than one Marine!"

Memorials
The Pacific War Memorial was built on Corregidor in memory of the American and Filipino soldiers who died.

The bridge in Chicago, Illinois, where State Street crosses the Chicago River is named the 'Bataan-Corregidor Memorial Bridge'.

The bridge over the Farmington River on Connecticut Route 185 in Simsbury, Connecticut was renamed the 'Bataan Corregidor Memorial Bridge' in honor of World War II servicemen who fought in the Battle of Bataan and the Battle of Corregidor. Connecticut State Senator Kevin Witkos hosted the dedication ceremony on Saturday, December 7, 2013.

See also
Battle of Bataan
 Naval Base Manila
Philippines campaign (1941–1942)The History Channel: Battle for the Pacific'', the battle is featured in this video game

Notes

References

Further reading
The Fall of the Philippines United States Army Center of Military History
Hyperwar: The Siege and Capture of Corregidor

External links

Corregidor Historical Society website
Animated History of The Battle of Bataan and Corregidor
Chicago's Bataan-Corregidor Memorial Bridge
Proclamation of Bataan-Corregidor Day

1942 in Japan
1942 in the Philippines
Corregidor
History of Cavite
United States Marine Corps in World War II
Corregidor*
United States military in the Philippines
Corregidor
C
May 1942 events